

People 
 Friedrich Wilhelm von Driesen (1781-1851), general officer of the imperial Russian army.
 Georg Wilhelm von Driesen (1700-1758), lieutenant general in Frederick the Great's Prussian army.

See also 
 4th (Westphalian) Cuirassiers "von Driesen", a heavy cavalry regiment of the Royal Prussian Army.